The Colorado Mammoth are a lacrosse team based in Colorado playing in the National Lacrosse League (NLL). The 2005 season was the 19th in franchise history and 3rd as the Mammoth (previously the Washington Power, Pittsburgh Crossefire, and Baltimore Thunder).

The 2005 season was lacrosse legend Gary Gait's final season as a player. He led the Mammoth to an 8-8 record, 3rd in the Western division, but they were eliminated from the playoffs by the Arizona Sting in the division finals. Gait would take over as the Mammoth's head coach the next season.

Regular season

Conference standings

Game log
Reference:

Playoffs

Game log
Reference:

Player stats
Reference:

Runners (Top 10)

Note: GP = Games played; G = Goals; A = Assists; Pts = Points; LB = Loose Balls; PIM = Penalty minutes

Goaltenders
Note: GP = Games played; MIN = Minutes; W = Wins; L = Losses; GA = Goals against; Sv% = Save percentage; GAA = Goals against average

Awards

Transactions

Trades

Roster
Reference:

See also
2005 NLL season

References

Colorado
Colorado Mammoth